Uncia is a tin mine in the department of Potosí, capital of the Rafael Bustillo province in western Bolivia. It was served by a railway branch from Oruro. It was one of the mines owned by Simón Iturri Patiño.

References 

Tin mines in Bolivia